Graciela Martins (born 5 April 1987 in Bissau, Guinea-Bissau) is a Bissau-Guinean athlete. She competed in the 400 m event at the 2012 Summer Olympics in London.

She also represented her country at the 2011 World Championships in Athletics. She was a silver medalist in the 400 metres hurdles at the 2014 Lusophony Games.

References

1987 births
Living people
Bissau-Guinean female sprinters
Olympic athletes of Guinea-Bissau
Athletes (track and field) at the 2012 Summer Olympics
World Athletics Championships athletes for Guinea-Bissau
Olympic female sprinters